Polly Guerin was an author, fashion historian and retired Fashion Institute of Technology adjunct professor.

Her 2013 book, The Cooper-Hewitt Dynasty of New York is an overview of Peter Cooper, his son-in-law, Abram S. Hewitt, and the latter's three daughters who were responsible for what is now the Cooper-Hewitt National Design Museum. In 2015, she published The General Society of Mechanics and Tradesmen of the City of New York: A History in honor of the more than two-hundred year history of the General Society of Mechanics and Tradesmen of the City of New York.

References

External links

20th-century births
2021 deaths
Fashion Institute of Technology people
21st-century American women writers
Writers from New York (state)
Year of birth missing